is a Japanese former figure skater who is now a figure skating commentator. She is the 1993 Winter Universiade champion and a two-time World Junior silver medalist (1988–89). She placed 14th at the 1988 Winter Olympics.

Yaginuma guest-starred as herself in the fourth episode of Juken Sentai Gekiranger, teaching the Gekirangers how to ice skate.

Results

References

External links 
Junko Yaginuma official blog

1973 births
Living people
Japanese female single skaters
Olympic figure skaters of Japan
Figure skaters at the 1988 Winter Olympics
World Junior Figure Skating Championships medalists
Sportspeople from Tokyo
Universiade medalists in figure skating
Universiade gold medalists for Japan
Competitors at the 1993 Winter Universiade